The Cudell was a German car made from 1898 to 1908.  It was made in Aachen until 1905, and thenceforth in Berlin.

Max Cudell founded the company in 1898 to manufacture licensed De Dion-Bouton vehicles.  The original 3-wheelers  were succeeded by a 3.5hp voiturette.  These were followed by more De Dion-style vehicles until 1904.  In that year, Karl Slevogt-designed vehicles premiered with little, if any, resemblance to the former French-influenced models.  These new cars featured an advanced 4-cylinder engine that had a 5-bearing crankshaft and overhead valves.  Versions of the engines ranged from 16/20PS to a 6.1L 35/40PS.  The Berlin branch was headed by Paul Cudell and did not make many cars.  After auto manufacture was stopped, the company continued to manufacture marine engines, as well as a carburetor of the same name.

The US agent Clodio & Widmayer based at 10 West 33rd Street in New York City presented Cudell vehicles at the 1904 New York Automobile Show. A version with 22 HP and water-cooling was available, too.

References

Bibliography

Defunct motor vehicle manufacturers of Germany